The World Figure Skating Championships is an annual figure skating competition sanctioned by the International Skating Union in which figure skaters compete for the title of World Champion.

Men's competitions took place from February 16 to 18 in Stockholm, Sweden. Ladies' competitions took place February from 10 to 11 in Oslo, Norway. Pairs' competition took place on February 23 in Helsinki, Finland.

Results

Men

 Referee: Mr. Ulrich Salchow 

Judges:
 Mr. Herbert J. Clarke 
 Mr. Hans Günauer 
 Mr. A. Von Jarmy 
 Mr. Walter Jakobsson 
 Mr. Zaden Johansen 
 Mr. Władysław Kuchar 
 Mr. Artur Vieregg

Ladies

Judges:
 H. Günauer 
 A. von Jarmy 
 R. Lund 
 Charles Sabouret 
 Per Thorén 
 Artur Vieregg 
 C. L. Wilson

Pairs

Judges:
 A. von Jarmy 
 Władysław Kuchar 
 T. Monthander 
 Th. Schjöll 
 H. Bardy 
 Artur Vieregg 
 H. Günauer

Sources
 Result List provided by the ISU

World Figure Skating Championships
World Figure Skating Championships
World Figure Skating Championships 1934
World Figure Skating Championships 1934
World Figure Skating Championships 1934
International figure skating competitions hosted by Finland
International figure skating competitions hosted by Norway
International figure skating competitions hosted by Sweden
1934 in Finnish sport
1934 in Norwegian sport
1934 in Swedish sport
1930s in Stockholm
1930s in Oslo
1930s in Helsinki
International sports competitions in Helsinki
International sports competitions in Stockholm
International sports competitions in Oslo
February 1934 sports events